WMMB (1240 AM) and WMMV (1350 AM) are commercial radio stations simulcasting a talk radio format. WMMB is licensed to Melbourne, Florida, and WMMV is licensed to Cocoa, Florida. The radio studios and offices are on South Babcock Street in Melbourne.

Both stations are powered at 1,000 watts.  WMMB uses a non-directional antenna.  But WMMV is directional at night to protect other stations on 1350 AM.  In Melbourne, programming can also be heard on 250 watt FM translator W224DJ at 92.7 MHz.

Programming
Weekdays begin with a local news and information show, "Bill Mick Live."  The rest of the weekday schedule is made up of nationally syndicated talk shows, including Glenn Beck, Sean Hannity, Clay Travis & Buck Sexton, Joe Pags, Jesse Kelly, "Coast to Coast AM with George Noory" and "America in the Morning.

Weekends feature programs on money, health, gardening, guns and technology.  Weekend hosts include Bill Cunningham, Art Bell, Kim Komando and repeats of weekday shows.  The stations also broadcast Miami Dolphins football games in the fall.  Most hours begin with world and national news from Fox News Radio.

History
WMMB first signed on the air in 1946.  The station that became WMMV went on the air in 1957.

References

External links
FCC History Cards for WMMB
FCC History Cards for WMMV

IHeartMedia radio stations
MMB